is a district of Shibuya, Tokyo, Japan.

As of October 2020, the population of this district is 591. The postal code for Dōgenzaka is 150–0043.

Local landmarks here include Shibuya 109, Bunkamura and the Statue of Hachikō.

Geography
Dōgenzaka borders Udagawachō in the north, Sakuragaokachō to the south, and Nanpeidaichō to the west.

Education
 operates public elementary and junior high schools.

All of Dogenzaka (1 and 2-chome) is zoned to Jinnan Elementary School (神南小学校), and Shoto Junior High School (松濤中学校).

References

Neighborhoods of Tokyo
Shibuya